Acapulco, cuerpo y alma (English: Acapulco, Body and Soul), is a Mexican telenovela produced by José Alberto Castro in 1995 for Televisa. It is a remake of the Mexican telenovela produced by Televisa in 1985, Tú o nadie.

Patricia Manterola and Saúl Lisazo star as the main protagonists, while Guillermo García Cantú and Chantal Andere star as the main antagonists.

Plot 
David Montalvo is a successful businessman enjoying prestige and brightness, plus his gallantry allowed to have any woman he pleases. That success is celebrated as both envied, because although enjoys an excellent relationship with his stepmother and his sister Cinthia and Elena, unable to relate to Marcelo, son of Elena and her first husband.

Marcelo deeply envies and hates David and gradually plans to snatch his wealth and power. In Zihuatanejo, Marcelo meets Lorena Garcia, a waitress at a seaside bar, courting her as David Montalvo until she falls in love with him. A few months later, they marry and then Marcelo and his henchman, German, sabotages a plane David and his associates are travelling in, causing it to crash.

Marcelo confesses the truth to Lorena, forcing her to be his accomplice, because as Lorena believed to be David's widow, she is his sole heir. Marcelo will then inherit David's entire fortune when he married Lorena. However, David survives and returns but is made to believe he has partial amnesia, when he fails to recognise his 'wife'. Slowly falling in love with David, Lorena breaks down and tells him the truth one night during a walk on the beach. David, already in love with Lorena, accepts her as his wife, much to Marcelo's rage. Helped by David's vengeful ex-girlfriend Aide, he sets out to drive the couple apart.

Cast 

 Patricia Manterola as Lorena García
 Saúl Lisazo as David Montalvo
 Guillermo García Cantú as Marcelo de Maris
 Chantal Andere as Haydeé San Román
 Karla Álvarez as Julia García
 Elsa Aguirre as Doña Ana Elena de Montalvo
 Cecilia Gabriela as Cynthia Montalvo
 Patricia Navidad as Clara
 Fernando Balzaretti as Aurelio García
 Manuel "Flaco" Ibáñez as Teodoro
 Rosángela Balbó as Claudia de San Román
 Leticia Perdigón as Rita
 Adriana Lavat as Liliana San Román
 Tomás Goros as Germán
 Germán Gutiérrez as Pablo
 Eduardo Rivera as Óscar Rodríguez
 Julio Urreta as Rosendo
 Lucha Moreno as Cleo
 Julio Vega as Félix
 Marcelo Cezán as Enrique 
 Sofía Vergara as Irasema
 Juan Soler as Humberto Bautista
 Dalilah Polanco as Juana Dorantes
 Germán Bernal as Raúl
 Zamorita as Goyo
 Rosita Bouchot as Dora
 Edi Xol as Arturo Durand
 Alfredo Leal as Ricardo de Maris
 Bodokito as Mariela 
 Claudia Vega as Marina
 Kala as Ronaldo Torres
 Alejandra Espejo as Elvira Torres
 Andrea Noli as Sandra
 Lucero Reynoso as Marta
 Fernanda Ruizos as Mauricia
 Jeanette Candiani as Yulissa 
 Mario Cimarro as Ali
 Julio Mannino as Alex
 Adela Ayensa as Vogue
 Ana María de la Torre as Sayli
 Aracely Arámbula

Jorge Auxaras es Gamaliel

References

External links 

1995 telenovelas
1995 Mexican television series debuts
1996 Mexican television series endings
Mexican telenovelas
Televisa telenovelas
Spanish-language telenovelas